John  Marvin (September 2, 1678–February 2, 1776)  was a member of the House of Representatives of the Colony of Connecticut from Norwalk in the sessions of May 1734, and May 1738.

He was the son of Matthew Marvin, Jr. and Mary Brush.

In 1708, he was appointed town collector of the town of Norwalk.

On December 14, 1711, he was chosen surveyor of highways.

On December 18, 1712, he was on a committee to obtain a teacher for the school.

He was chosen as a selectman in 1706, 1713 and 1719.

He served as a constable in 1717.

He served as fence viewer in 1721 and 1729.

He served as a "lyster," in 1724.

In 1734 and 1738 he represented Norwalk in the General Assembly. In 1718, he, along with others was chosen to lay before "a wise and judicious committee" the "surcomstances of ye town in their present differences respecting the meeting-house." In 1734, along with Joseph Platt, he was appointed to lay out the land granted by the town "in ye plain before Lt. Lee's door," for St. Paul's Church.

On November 18, 1737, he gave a lot of land eight rods square to the "Presbiterian or Congregational church of Wilton, on which to erect a meetinghouse." He confirmed this by deed on May 6, 1738, in which he said "among the congregation are some of my children," naming his son John as one.

On January 21, 1752, he bought for £2400 the farm previously owned by his son John in Sharon, and settled there not long afterward.

References 

1678 births
1776 deaths
Connecticut city council members
Members of the Connecticut House of Representatives
Politicians from Norwalk, Connecticut
People of colonial Connecticut